The 1957 Washington Senators won 55 games and lost 99 in their 57th year in the American League, and finished in eighth and last place, attracting 457,079 spectators to Griffith Stadium, last in the major leagues. Chuck Dressen began the year as their manager, but after the Senators dropped 16 of their first 20 games, Dressen was replaced by Cookie Lavagetto on May 7. Lavagetto, a longtime aide to Dressen, went 51–83 for the rest of the year, but would remain at the club's helm into June 1961, its first season as the Minnesota Twins.

The 1957 Senators set an MLB record which still stands for the fewest stolen bases by a team in a season, with only 13. Washington left fielder Roy Sievers set a new team record with 42 home runs to the lead the Junior Circuit, as he benefited from Griffith Stadium's shorter dimensions in left and left-center field, which had been implemented before the 1956 campaign.

Offseason 
 Prior to 1957 season: Choo-Choo Coleman was released by the Senators.

Regular season

Season standings

Record vs. opponents

Opening Day lineup

Notable transactions 
 April 29, 1957: Bob Chakales and Dean Stone were traded by the Senators to the Boston Red Sox for Faye Throneberry, Milt Bolling and Russ Kemmerer.
 June 17, 1957: Jim Kaat was signed as an amateur free agent by the Senators.

Roster

Player stats

Batting

Starters by position 
Note: Pos = Position; G = Games played; AB = At bats; H = Hits; Avg. = Batting average; HR = Home runs; RBI = Runs batted in

Other batters 
Note: G = Games played; AB = At bats; H = Hits; Avg. = Batting average; HR = Home runs; RBI = Runs batted in

Pitching

Starting pitchers 
Note: G = Games pitched; IP = Innings pitched; W = Wins; L = Losses; ERA = Earned run average; SO = Strikeouts

Other pitchers 
Note: G = Games pitched; IP = Innings pitched; W = Wins; L = Losses; ERA = Earned run average; SO = Strikeouts

Relief pitchers 
Note: G = Games pitched; W = Wins; L = Losses; SV = Saves; ERA = Earned run average; SO = Strikeouts

Farm system 

Kinston franchise transferred to Wilson and renamed, May 11, 1957; Midland franchise transferred to Lamesa, August 1, 1957

Notes

References 
1957 Washington Senators at Baseball-Reference
1957 Washington Senators team page at www.baseball-almanac.com

Minnesota Twins seasons
Washington Senators season
Washington Senators